Mark Flanagan (born 2 August 1989) is a retired Irish rugby union player. He played as a lock.

Leinster

Flanagan made his debut for Leinster in a Pro12 game in April 2010 against Glasgow Warriors and made nine league appearances for his club.

Stade Montois

Flanagan spent two successful seasons, playing for French D2 side, Stade Montois. Scoring a try in 39 appearances.

Bedford Blues

In Flanagan's first spell at Bedford he achieved 19 caps and a try. Signing for Saracens at the end of just one season with the Blues.

Saracens

Flanagan was a part of the 2017-2018 Aviva Premiership Saracens squad, that finished as champions. A close fought win over Exeter Chiefs in the final. Although Flanagan only featured 5 times and was not even among the subs for the final win.

Munster

In September 2017, Flanagan joined Irish Pro14 side Munster on a three-month loan. He made his competitive debut for Munster on 30 September 2017, coming off the bench against Cardiff Blues in Round 5 of the 2017–18 Pro14. Flanagan made his first start for Munster on 15 October 2017, doing so in the provinces opening 2017–18 European Rugby Champions Cup fixture against Castres.

References

External links
Saracens Profile
Bedford Profile
Munster Profile

1989 births
Living people
Irish rugby union players
Rugby union locks
Leinster Rugby players
Stade Montois players
Bedford Blues players
Saracens F.C. players
Munster Rugby players
Rugby union players from County Westmeath